KWDZ (910 AM) was a broadcast radio station licensed to Salt Lake City, Utah, serving the Salt Lake City metropolitan area. The station was owned and operated by iHeartMedia. The KWDZ broadcast license was held by Citicasters Licenses, Inc.

History

The station was founded in 1945 and originally held the callsign KALL. It was originally owned by Mr. and Mrs. George C. Hatch and Mr. and Mrs. Robert H. Hinkley. In 1946, John F. Fitzpatrick, publisher of The Salt Lake Tribune (owned by the Kearns Corporation), representing the Tribune, purchased fifty percent interest in the station from the owners. The Tribune's interest (Kearns-Tribune, Corp.) sold its interest in 1954 to permit its owner (Kearns-Tribune, Corp.) to apply for a license to buy a television license and to purchase a fifty percent ownership in KUTV Channel 2.

KALL had long aired a full service format. In the early 1990s, the station began airing a news/talk format, carrying programming such as The Rush Limbaugh Show and The G. Gordon Liddy Show. The station's ownership changed several times during the 1990s; in 1992, Communications Investment Corp. sold the station to Apollo Radio Partners, owner of KKAT, ending George C. Hatch's ownership of KALL. Apollo Radio sold its stations to Regent Communications in 1995; Regent, in turn, sold its stations to Jacor in 1997. Jacor merged with Clear Channel Communications in 1999. On March 6, 2000, the station's format was adjusted when its sister station KNRS adopted a talk radio format, and the station adopted the slogan "talk radio with an attitude", carrying hosts such as Jim Bohannon and Phil Hendrie.

Clear Channel sold KALL to Mercury Broadcasting Company after its 2001 acquisition of KTVX brought them over ownership limits; it continued to sell advertising on the station under a joint sales agreement. In 2003, Disney/ABC purchased the station for $3,700,000, while the intellectual property and callsign was purchased by Clear Channel Communications for $2,000,000. Disney/ABC bought the station to clear its Radio Disney network, which was about to be dropped by previous affiliate KBEE. Clear Channel moved KALL's talk programming and the KALL callsign to 700 kHz, and on April 30, 2003, the station changed its call sign to KWDZ.

In June 2013, Disney put KWDZ and six other Radio Disney stations in medium markets up for sale, in order to refocus the network's broadcast distribution on top-25 markets. On August 17, 2013, KWDZ dropped the Radio Disney affiliation and went silent. After almost one year, KWDZ resumed operations on August 14, 2014. Initially broadcasting locally originated automated programming upon its return to the air, Radio Disney programming returned sometime around late September 2014. By that time, Disney had announced plans to sell all but one of Radio Disney's remaining 23 owned-and-operated stations. Originally planning to sign-off the stations on September 26, 2014, Disney later decided to keep the stations on the air until they were sold.

On May 29, 2015, Radio Disney Group filed an application to sell KWDZ to the Citicasters Licenses, Inc. subsidiary of iHeartMedia (the former Clear Channel Communications). iHeart bought KWDZ (and WRDZ-FM) for $1.95 million. The sale was approved by the FCC on July 14, 2015. The sale was completed on July 17, 2015 and the station went silent again. Following temporary operations in May 2016 and April 2017, iHeartMedia surrendered the KWDZ license on April 25, 2018; the Federal Communications Commission cancelled it on June 26, 2018.

References

External links
FCC Station Search Details: DKWDZ (Facility ID: 2445)
FCC History Cards for KWDZ (covering 1944-1980 as KALL)

Mass media in Salt Lake City
IHeartMedia radio stations
WDZ
Radio stations established in 1945
1945 establishments in Utah
Radio stations disestablished in 2018
2018 disestablishments in Utah
Defunct radio stations in the United States
WDZ
Former subsidiaries of The Walt Disney Company